Mohamed Ilhan bin Mohamed Noor (born 19 December 2002) is a Singaporean professional footballer who plays as a left-back, right-back or winger for Singapore Premier League club Young Lions FC, on loan from Geylang International FC.

He is the son of Noor Ali.

Club

Geylang International
He made his debut against Lion City Sailors.

Career statistics

Club

Notes

References

2002 births
Living people
Singaporean footballers
Association football defenders
Singapore Premier League players
Geylang International FC players